Nancy Guillén (born October 14, 1976) is a retired female hammer thrower from El Salvador. She set her personal best throw (62.43 metres) on June 9, 2001 at a meet in San Salvador. This is the current Salvadorean record.

She attended Oklahoma State University in Stillwater, Oklahoma and Southern Methodist University in Dallas, Texas.

Achievements

References

1976 births
Living people
Salvadoran hammer throwers
Athletes (track and field) at the 1999 Pan American Games
Athletes (track and field) at the 2003 Pan American Games
Pan American Games competitors for El Salvador
World Athletics Championships athletes for El Salvador
Female hammer throwers
Salvadoran female athletes
Central American Games gold medalists for El Salvador
Central American Games medalists in athletics
Central American and Caribbean Games bronze medalists for El Salvador
Competitors at the 2002 Central American and Caribbean Games
Central American and Caribbean Games medalists in athletics